Christopher Jon Olsen is the creator of the Universal wheelchair, the first all-terrain, omnidirectional, stair-climbing wheelchair. He is also the co-founder of NuEra Mobility Inc.

Christopher started designing the wheelchair in his senior year of high school for an independent study science research class through the University at Albany. The idea for his project came from his mother, a nurse who cares for a patient with multiple sclerosis who had played wheelchair tennis until she lost additional functionality. Christopher began working on a device to help her regain her athletic ability when he began to recognize the numerous everyday obstacles people in wheelchairs face. As a result, he decided to design a wheelchair that could function on all terrain.

His design criteria included: omnidirectional movement; the ability to climb curbs and other obstacles up to eight inches high; the ability to travel along natural paths and rough terrain; 4-wheel drive; and the ability to adjust the center of gravity, seat height and width. He began with preliminary sketches of wheel designs and found a hubless wheel would allow off-set pivot points for added extension of the arms. Each wheel has a small drive motor like those used in robots that are connected to linear actuators that allow sufficient extension to climb steps.

After designing the wheelchair, Christopher entered and won the 2006 Tri-Region Science and Engineering Fair. This allowed him to compete in the 2006 Intel International Science and Engineering Fair in Indianapolis. While at the Intel ISEF, Christopher won the $10,000 inaugural USPatent.com Award from Woodard, Emhardt, Moriarty, McNett & Henry LLP based in Indianapolis. This award was created "to recognize and applaud young persons’ efforts in developing innovative solutions that benefit our world."

Christopher then appeared on Fox & Friends with his wheelchair. Shortly after, Christopher also appeared on a television show, representing the United States, on the Science Channel Japan. He also appeared in Gizmag as a finalist in the 2006 Intel ISEF competition.

Currently, Christopher is an undergraduate student at Binghamton University where he is continuing to refine the wheelchair that he recently received a US and foreign patent for. His company, NuEra Mobility, Inc. will start production of the product shortly.

References

External links
NuEra Mobility

21st-century American inventors
People from Orange County, New York
Living people
Year of birth missing (living people)
Binghamton University alumni